Killer Instinct is a series of fighting video games.
Killer Instinct (1994 video game), the first installment in the fighting-game series
Killer Instinct (2013 video game), the third game in the series

Killer Instinct may also refer to:

Film and television
 Killer Instinct (1988 film), an American television film directed by Waris Hussein
 Killer Instinct (1991 film), an American film written and directed by David Tausik
 Killer Instinct (1992 film) or Mad Dog Coll, an American film directed by Greydon Clark
 Killer Instinct (TV series), a 2005 American crime drama series
 Killer Instinct, a 2015 American true-crime TV series hosted by Chris Hansen

Other media
 Killer Instinct (card game), a Topps collectible card game
 Killer Instinct (novel), a 2006 novel by Joseph Finder
 The Killer Instinct, a 2015 album by Black Star Riders

See also 
 KI (disambiguation)